In some countries, a senior advisor (also spelt senior adviser, especially in the UK) is an appointed position by the Head of State to advise on the highest levels of national and government policy. Sometimes a junior position to this is called a National Policy Advisor. In some instances, these advisors form a Council of State or a State Council. Senior Advisor also is a title for senior civil servants or partisan advisors in several countries, and is also used in nonprofit organisations.

Islamic Republic of Pakistan
Advisor to President of Pakistan is title mostly used for the member of advisory committee to President of Pakistan. Constitution of Pakistan allows President to keep advisors. The president is the ceremonial head of the state, is the civilian commander-in-chief of the Pakistan Armed Forces with Chairman Joint Chiefs of Staff Committee as its principal military adviser. Abdul Qadir Patel was appointed as political advisor to president Asif Zardari after resignation of former adviser Faisal Raza Abidi.

Sri Lanka
Senior Adviser to the President is a title used by highest-ranking advisers to the President of Sri Lanka.

Taiwan 
The President of the Republic of China (Taiwan) can appoint Senior Advisors to the Office of the President of the Republic of China (中華民國總統府資政) and National Policy Advisors to the Office of the President of the Republic of China (中華民國總統府國策顧問), but they do not form a council.

United States

Senior advisor is a title used within the Executive Branch of the United States Government for various positions. The title has been formally used since 1993.

Nonprofit organizations
In nonprofit organizations, Senior Advisors deploy specialized expertise in support of an organization's mission. They may provide counsel and advice with respect to various aspects of its work. Senior Advisors often serve to fill lacunae in the skill sets of Directors or Executives.

References

External links
 Office of the Senior Advisor to the President, from a website of the Miller Center of Public Affairs at the University of Virginia
Office of the Senior Advisor to the (NASA) Administrator

Executive branch of the government of the United States
Senior Advisors to the Office of the President of the Republic of China
Government advisors